Magnus Bjorndal (September 13, 1899 – January 23, 1971) was a Norwegian American engineer and inventor. Magnus Bjorndal was the founder and president of Tech Laboratories, Inc.

Biography
Magnus Bjorndal was from Ulstein in Møre og Romsdal county, Norway. He held degrees in both electrical and mechanical engineering. Mechanical trade school at Porsgrunn (now Telemark University College) in Telemark county, Norway. He also studied at the Hindenburg Polytechnicum in Oldenburg, Germany. At age 24, Magnus Bjorndal came to the United States in 1923. He studied electrical engineering at Brooklyn Polytech (now Polytechnic Institute of New York University).

Magnus Bjorndal served as chief engineer of The Daven Radio Company, an electronics manufacturer in Newark, New Jersey. Subsequently he was the founder and president of Tech Laboratories, Inc., which was incorporated in the state of New Jersey in 1937. Tech Laboratories developed the initial test and control instruments for the NBC Radio City Studios in New York City. Bjorndal personally held a number of United States patents for scientific and technical instruments.

Bjorndal was a member of American Institute of Electrical Engineers, American Association for the Advancement of Science and Audio Engineering Society. Bjorndal served as editor of the Norwegian-American Technical Journal. He was president of Norwegian-American Historical Association (1969–1971).

Bjorndal died in Hoboken, New Jersey in 1971.

Selected listing of patents
 Terminal For Resistors – Patent number: 1971809, Filing date: Oct 28, 1929, Issue date: Aug 1934
 Variable Speed Gearing – Patent number: 1883500, Filing date: Nov 24, 1930, Issue date: Oct 18, 1932
 Electric Hydrometer – Patent number: 2071607, Filing date: December 13, 1933, Issue date: Feb 23, 1937

References

Other sources
 Saga in Steel and Concrete – Norwegian Engineers in America (Kenneth Bjork. Northfield, Minnesota: Norwegian-American Historical Association. 1947)
 Migrants, immigrants, and slaves: racial and ethnic groups in America (George Henderson, Thompson Dele Olasiji. University Press of America. 1995)

1899 births
1971 deaths
American civil engineers
Norwegian engineers
Technical University of Munich alumni
Norwegian emigrants to the United States
People from Ulstein
People from Møre og Romsdal
20th-century American engineers